Songam Cavern is a major tourist venue in North Korea.  It consists of 17 well-lit karst caves full of picturesque stone formations including stalactites and stalagmites.  The cavern is located in Kaech'ŏn-si, South Pyongan Province.

Among the 70 scenic sites within the caverns are the flower gate (Kkotmun Dong), a waterfall (Phokpho Dong), an underground snowscape (Solgyong Dong) and a series of geological curiosities named Kiam Dong.

The venue is lighted and air conditioned.  International tourism to the site is administered through the Korea International Travel Agency in Pyongyang.

See also
Tourism in North Korea

External links
Songam Cavern picture album at Naenara

Kaechon
Caves of North Korea
Limestone caves
Tourism in North Korea
South Pyongan